There have been three baronetcies created for persons with the surname Oakes, all in the Baronetage of the United Kingdom. Two of the creations were in favour of the same person.

The Oakes Baronetcy, of the Army, was created in the Baronetage of the United Kingdom on 2 November 1813 for the soldier Hildebrand Oakes. On 1 June 1815 he was given a new patent, of Hereford, with remainder to his younger brother Henry. The 1813 creation became extinct on his death in 1822 while he was succeeded in the 1815 creation according to the special remainder by his brother Henry, the second Baronet. This title became extinct on the death of the fourth Baronet in 1927.

The Oakes Baronetcy, of Nassau in the Bahama Islands, was created in the Baronetage of the United Kingdom on 27 July 1939 for the gold-mine owner and philanthropist Harry Oakes.

Oakes baronets, of the Army (1813)
Sir Hildebrand Oakes, 1st Baronet (1754–1822)

Oakes baronets, of Hereford (1815)
Sir Hildebrand Oakes, 1st Baronet (1754–1822)
Sir Henry Oakes, 2nd Baronet (1756–1827)
Sir Henry Thomas Oakes, 3rd Baronet (1795–1850)
Sir Reginald Louis Oakes, 4th Baronet (1847–1927)

Oakes baronets, of Nassau (1939)
Sir Harry Oakes, 1st Baronet (1874–1943)
Sir Sydney Oakes, 2nd Baronet (1927–1966)
Sir Christopher Oakes, 3rd Baronet (born 1949)

The heir apparent to the baronetcy is Victor Oakes (born 1983), only son of the 3rd Baronet.

Notes

References
Kidd, Charles, Williamson, David (editors). Debrett's Peerage and Baronetage (1990 edition). New York: St Martin's Press, 1990.

Biography of Sir Henry Oakes, 2nd Baronet

Baronetcies in the Baronetage of the United Kingdom
Extinct baronetcies in the Baronetage of the United Kingdom
Baronetcies created with special remainders